The mix of ammonium salts of phosphorylated glycerides can be either made synthetically or from mixture of glycerol and partially hardened plant (most often used: rapeseed oil) oils.

Applications 
It is most often used in chocolate industry as an emulsifier, often as alternative to lecithin.

Properties 
At room temperature it is liquid.

Synonyms 
 Ammonium phosphatide
 Emulsifier YN
 E number E442

See also 
Polyglycerol polyricinoleate (PGPR)

Food additives
E-number additives